In October 1994, Billboard magazine established  Tropical Airplay, a chart that ranks the top-performing songs played on tropical radio stations in the United States based on weekly airplay data compiled by Nielsen's Broadcast Data Systems (BDS). It is a subchart of Hot Latin Songs, which lists the best-performing Spanish-language songs in the country. According to an 1985 article by Billboard, tropical music is the "sound of the Spanish-speaking Caribbean – though it extends beyond it". It usually encompasses dance genres such as salsa, merengue, bachata, vallenato, and the Colombian cumbia and tropical music in Mexico. Five songs topped the chart in 1994 and 12 tracks did the same in 1995. Until November 5, 1994, BDS ran test charts which only listed the number one song of the week on Billboards electronic database.

The first song to reach number one on the Tropical Airplay chart was "Quién Eres Tú" by Luis Enrique which remained in the top spot for three weeks. It was replaced by La India's cover of "Nunca Voy a Olvidarte", making her the first female artist to reach the top of the chart. Both artists were the only acts to have more than one chart-topper in 1994. La India had the final number one song of the year with her rendition of "Ese Hombre" which was also the first at the start of 1995. La India and Gloria Estefan were the only female acts to reach number one in 1995.

Marc Anthony was the artist with the most songs at number one in 1995 with "Te Conozco Bien",  "Se Me Sigue Olvidando", and "Nadie Como Ella". "Te Conozco Bien" held this position for the longest with eight weeks and was named the best-performing tropical song of the year by Billboard. Marc Anthony also had the final chart-topper of the year with "Nadie Como Ella". Cuban pianist Paquito Hechavarría collaborated with fellow Cuban artist Rey Ruiz on the track "Piano" for the 1995 album of the same name (although Ruiz was not credited for this release on Billboards chart database) and spent six weeks on top of the chart. Ruiz himself achieved his first number one with "Estamos Solos". Edgar Joel and  Johnny Rivera obtained their only chart-toppers in 1994 and 1995, respectively.

Chart history

See also
1994 in Latin music
1995 in Latin music

References

United States Tropical Airplay
United States Tropical Airplay
1994 and 1995
1994 in Latin music
1995 in Latin music
1994 in American music
1995 in American music